is a prominent Japanese printmaker and president of the Japan Print Society. His artwork has been featured on Japan Post postage stamps as well as featured in exhibitions at the Library of Congress and the Peabody Essex Museum in Salem, Massachusetts. Takumi currently teaches woodblock printing at Waseda University in Tokyo.

Takumi's interest in the woodblock printing began at a young age when his father, a painter, encouraged his study of the arts. Having a special interest in Japanese matsuri festivals and folk art, especially mingei, many of Takumi's prints explore the local cultures of Japan's rural areas, such as his own Miyagi Prefecture.

References
 Akita, Manami. "'Asobi wa' Kyukyoku no Yorokobi." Hanga Geijutsu 118, December 2002: 58–61.
 Yoshida, Shozo. "Tono Kitamami no Tohoku Minzoku Geino to Hangaka Itow Takumi." Gekkan Ashita, March 1987.

External links
 Japan Print Society, official site

1946 births
Japanese printmakers
Japanese educators
Crafts educators
Living people
Sosaku hanga artists